Donald L. Robertson Park is a public park in Wood Village, Oregon, United States. The park has a playground, an arboretum, a basketball court, and a wetland area.

References

Parks in Multnomah County, Oregon